The 2008–09 Wayne State Warriors women's ice hockey season head coach was Jim Fetter. Assisting Fetter was Nicolette Franck and Allison Rutledge. The equipment manager was Jim Campbell while the assistant athletic trainer was Katie Lang.

Exhibition

Regular season
Delayne Brian made 22 saves in her collegiate debut on Oct. 3 against Bemidji State. She earned two wins Jan. 23–24 at Syracuse, totaling 56 saves including a season-high 34 in the second game.
Lindsay DiPietro completed her Wayne State career as the program's all-time leader with 132 assists, sixth-most in NCAA history. She was also WSU's third all-time leading scorer with 188 points, third in goals (56), third in power play goals (18), and second in power play points (79).
She finished her career second in CHA points (92), third in CHA goals (27), and first in CHA assists (65).
Alyssa Baldin tallied the game-winner and added a helper Oct. 24 versus Colgate. Baldin had a three-goal weekend Nov. 21–22 against Syracuse. She scored a power-play goal in each game of the Nutmeg Classic, including the game-winner Nov. 29 versus Quinnipiac, for another four-game point streak. At the Easton Holiday Showcase, she collected three power-play assists.
Brandi Frakie made her season debut on Jan. 16–17 against Robert Morris after missing 31 straight games due to injury (dating back to the 2007–08 season). She scored her first goal of the year Feb. 14 against Niagara
Christine Jefferson played in 31 games but missed the Nov. 15 contest against #10 Northeastern, snapping her career-long 77-game playing streak.

Roster

Schedule
The Warriors participated in the Nutmeg Classic, which was held from November 28–29. In addition, the club participate in the Easton Holiday Showcase in St. Cloud, Minnesota from January 2–3.

Player stats
Lindsay DiPietro collected five points on Dec. 5–6 at Niagara. She had two assists in the series opener and scored twice, including a short-handed and an empty net goal, with a power-play assist the next day. She posted her third straight multiple-point game Feb. 20 at Robert Morris and matched her career-best goal-scoring streak of six games. Overall, she led the Warriors with 17 multiple-point games
Alyssa Baldin finished eighth among College Hockey America rookies with 18 points, seventh-most by any freshman in WSU women's hockey history
Chelsea Burnett matched her career high with 19 points, and finished second in the conference behind teammate Natalie Payne in overall scoring by a defenseman.
Micheline Frappier finished 14th among all rookies in College Hockey America with nine points.
Veronique Laramee-Paquette finished sixth among rookies in College Hockey America with 20 points and tied for third with 10 conference points. In addition, she tied Katie Jones (2000–01) for fifth on WSU's all-time rookie points list. She collected three points Oct. 24–25 against Colgate, including a goal and a game-winning assist in the series opener. She posted her first career two-goal game Dec. 5 at Niagara.
Jill Szandzik led all first-year defensemen in the conference with 16 points. She posted her second straight two-assist game Dec. 5 at Niagara and assisted on both game-winning goals in a sweep Jan. 16–17 over Robert Morris. In addition, Szandzik broke Chelsea Burnett's school record for more points in a season by a rookie blueliner and finished fourth on WSU's single season lists for points and assists (14) by a defenseman, as well as assists by a rookie.

Skaters

Goaltenders
Delayne Brian finished her rookie season with a record of 15–6–0. She was two wins shy of Valery Turcotte's team record of 17 wins. She set a school record with a .714 winning percentage. Brian led College Hockey America with a .910 save percentage in conference action.
Lindsey Park led College Hockey America with a .921 save percentage (third-best in school history) and finished second with a school-record 2.10 goals-against average  She made 27 saves and surrendered just one power-play goal Oct. 4 for her first career victory.

Postseason
College Hockey America Tournament

Awards and honors
Alyssa Baldin, CHA Rookie of the Week (Oct. 20)
Alyssa Baldin, CHA Rookie of the Week (Nov. 21)
Delayne Brian, CHA Defensive Player of the Week honors (Jan. 26)
Delayne Brian, CHA Defensive Player of the Week (Feb. 16) after making 53 saves while allowing only two even-strength goals in two wins Feb. 13–14 over Niagara
Chelsea Burnett, All-College Hockey America Second Team for the second straight year
Chelsea Burnett, CHA All-Academic Team (she was the first Academic All-American in the history of the WSU women's hockey program)
Lindsay DiPietro, All-College Hockey America Second Team
Lindsay DiPietro, CHA All-Academic Team (Third time in her career)
Christine Jefferson, College Hockey America All-Academic Team
Veronique Laramee-Paquette, CHA Rookie of the Week honors (Oct. 27)
Veronique Laramee-Paquette, CHA Rookie of the Week honors (Dec. 5)
Katrina Protopapas, College Hockey America All-Academic Team
Jill Szandzik, College Hockey America All-Rookie Team

Team awards
Lindsay DiPietro received the Warrior Award, the Captain's Award and the President's Award (highest GPA on the team) at the season-end banquet

References

External links

Wayne State
Wayne State Warriors women's ice hockey seasons